Hungarian Catholic Church may refer to:

 Catholic Church in Hungary, incorporating all communities and institutions of the Catholic Church in Hungary (including the Latin Church)
 Hungarian Byzantine Catholic Church (an Eastern Catholic church of the Byzantine Rite, in full communion with the Church of Rome)

See also 
 Albanian Catholic Church
 Belarusian Catholic Church
 Bulgarian Catholic Church
 Croatian Catholic Church
 Greek Catholic Church
 Romanian Catholic Church
 Russian Catholic Church
 Serbian Catholic Church
 Slovak Catholic Church
 Ukrainian Catholic Church